Knockabout (Chinese: 雜家小子; Za jia xiao zi) is a 1979 Hong Kong martial arts comedy film starring Yuen Biao and directed by Sammo Hung, who also co-stars in the film.

Plot
The film follows two con artist brothers, Yipao / Little John (Yuen Biao) and Taipao / Big John (Bryan Leung). One day they are cheated out of their ill-gotten gains in an encounter with Jia Wu Dao / Silver Fox (Lau Kar Wing). They try to fight him, to retrieve their money, but are defeated, so they ask him to train them, hoping to become the best fighters in the city. After surpassing the fighting skills of "ordinary people", Yipao soon discovers that Jia Wu Dao is a murderer. When he realises his secret has been revealed, Jia Wu Dao attempts to kill Yipao, but Taipao blocks the fatal blow and is killed in his place.

Yipao escapes and plots how he will avenge his brother's death. He encounters a fat beggar (Sammo Hung) and, impressed by his kung fu, he asks the beggar to become his new kung fu master. After extensive training, the beggar asks Yipao to go and get him some wine. As he is about to return with the wine, Yipao encounters Jia Wu Dao again, and they fight, but Yipao's skill is insufficient. The fat beggar and Yipao then team up, using the monkey style kung fu, against Jia Wu Dao's snake style. As their fight moves outside of the wine shop, the fat beggar and Yipao defeat Jia Wu Dao, killing him with spiked vines, finally avenging Taipao's death. The fat beggar reveals that he is an undercover detective trying to arrest criminals, particularly Jia Wu Dao.

Cast
 Yuen Biao as Yipao / Little John
 Sammo Hung as Fat Beggar / Fatty Beggar / Lt. Fei
 Liang Chia-jen as Dai Pao / Big John
 Lau Kar-wing as Jia Wu Dao / Silver Fox
 Karl Maka as Captain
 Hoi Sang Lee as Painter
 Fo Sing as Tiger
 Chan Lung as Banker Wei
 Louis Lau as Banker Wei's dad
 Chung Fat as Vegetable hawker / Big Eyes

Box office
The domestic Hong Kong theatrical release of Knockabout' ran from 12–25 April 1979, taking HK $2,830,519.

See also
 List of Hong Kong films
 Sammo Hung filmography
 Yuen Biao filmography

References

External links
 
 
 Knockabout at the Kung Fu Cinema

1979 films
1979 martial arts films
1970s martial arts comedy films
1970s Cantonese-language films
Films about con artists
Films directed by Sammo Hung
Hong Kong films about revenge
Hong Kong martial arts comedy films
Kung fu films
1970s Hong Kong films